Demlin  is a village in the administrative district of Gmina Skarszewy, within Starogard County, Pomeranian Voivodeship, in northern Poland.

For details of the history of the region, see History of Pomerania.

The village has a population of 446.

Laijser Aijchenrand (one of the most important Jidisch poets) was born in Demlin in 1911 and died in 1985 in Küsnacht near Zurich, Switzerland.

References

Demlin